Another Life...Another End is the debut album released by power metal band Winter's Verge.  It was released on 2005 as an EP and on 2006 as a full-length album. The album consists of 9 songs and 1 intro track.

It delves into European style melodic prog/power metal with keyboards.

Track listing 

"Intro" - 1:28
"Eternal Damnation" - 5:21
"Exile" - 4:33
"For I Have Sinned" - 3:11
"Hold My Hand" - 5:20
"Goodbye" - 7:05
"A Secret Once Forgotten" - 5:33
"Can You Hear Me" - 5:31
"My Winter Sun" - 5:06
"Suicide Note" - 3:17

Personnel 
George Charalambous - vocals
Perikles Mallopoulos - guitars
Stefanos Psillides - keyboards
Miguel Trapezaris – bass
Andreas Charalambous – drums

References 

2006 debut albums
Winter's Verge albums